Mikhaylovka is a rural locality (a selo) in Kamennobrodskoye Rural Settlement, Olkhovsky District, Volgograd Oblast, Russia. The population was 152 as of 2010.

Geography 
Mikhaylovka is located in steppe, 16 km southwest of Olkhovka (the district's administrative centre) by road. Goskonyushnya is the nearest rural locality.

References 

Rural localities in Olkhovsky District
Tsaritsynsky Uyezd